An intercalated seizure is an epileptic seizure that occurs during the aura stage of a migraine. It has been found, in some cases, that this type of seizure is instigated by the migraine preceding it, coining the term "migraine-triggered seizure". In order to be considered such, the victim must have already had certified migraines with aura and a seizure must occur within one hour after the beginning of the aura. The neurological condition that combines migraines with epileptic seizures is known as migralepsy.

See also

 Migralepsy

References

Migraine
Seizure types